Anoop Sankar (born 22 May 1979) is an Indian film playback singer, songwriter, stage performer, VJ, RJ and media personality.

Early life and family

Anoop Sankar was born on 22 May 1979 into a family of music lovers, as the eldest son of T. A. Sankar and Latha Sankar who are ardent music lovers. 
Latha Sankar is a trained classical vocalist and the winner of Kerala University classical music competition. Anoop was initiated into Carnatic classical music learning at the age of six under the guidance of Sri. Chalappuram Pappa, under whom he learnt for 12 years. After completing his graduation, he moved to Chennai where he continued his learning under the renowned musician Neyveli Santhanagopalan. Anoop Sankar after completing his MCT & Master of Engineering chose to pursue his career in Music. He married Viji Viswanathan in 2009. Viji is a playback singer and a songwriter .

Career
Anoop Sankar came into limelight after winning the 2002 edition of the popular musical talent hunt Sapthaswarangal telecast in Sun TV. In the same year, on 21 and 22 September, Anoop along with 20 musicians under the name "Sangamam" set the Guinness World Records for the longest musical performance spanning over 40 hours at the Santhome Monfort School Auditorium, Chennai. He has performed extensively across the globe with legends like Dr. S. P. Balasubrahmanyam, Shankar Mahadevan, Hariharan, K. S. Chithra, Sujatha Mohan, Sadhana Sargam and Anuradha Sriram.

Anoop Sankar is a popular media personality having an experience of more than a decade. He has been a part of more than 1500 episodes of various television and radio shows of South Indian media as Judge, Host and Music mentor.

In 2003, he started working with the renowned music director Gopi Sundar and he was associated with him for more than 100 commercials of leading brands as a singer and a writer. Later he Sang for the movies of National Award-winning music directors like Ouseppachan , Vidyasagar, M. Jayachandran & Biji bal. Anoop's biggest hit came through the Musical single "Kurutham Kettavan" which was written and composed by Hariprasad and performed by National award-winning actor Suraj Venjaramoodu and Popular VJ Ranjini Haridas. He also got wide appreciation for the challenging classical song "Chandrachooda" composed by Navneeth Sundar from the movie Karmayogi.

Anoop made his debut in Tamil playback singing through Yuvan Shankar Raja musical "Agarram" and into Tulu films in the year 2015 through the song "Ora Oppi Bokka" for the movie "Dhand" composed by Abhishek SN. Anoop was also the Model for the brands Kalyan Sarees and Vishraam Builders and he did a cameo in the Malayalam Movie Vaadhyar.He is also the founder and creative head of AUM – Academy of Universal Music at Thrissur which was launched in the year 2016.

Anoop Sankar's Musical video of the Diwali celebrations hosted by Kalyan Jewellers in presence of legends Amitabh Bachchan, Sachin Tendulkar, Nagarjuna, Mammooty, Nivin Pauly, Manju Warrier, Prabhu, Jayaram, Hariharan, Sujata and Shweta Mohan became popular and has a viewership of more than 10 million across various pages in Social media. His Annual Charitable Musical event The Anoop Sankar Experience has been happening in Calicut Music Circle for a decade now. This is the tenth year of the show which spans over six hours featuring evergreen melodies in various languages and genres. Anoop also performed along with Shah Rukh Khan at Dubai in an exclusive musical event where Anoop rendered the legendary songs performed by Shah Rukh Khan. He also did an exclusive musical event in Mumbai attended by the Mukesh Ambani Family. He also performed a Unique Musical on 10 November 2019 at Calicut as a part of 10th Edition of Anoop Sankar Experience hosted by Calicut Music Circle. Anoop performed a Musical Tribute to the Maestro Isaignani Ilaiyaraja by singing 105 songs of him for 11 Hours non-stop. This fete is all set to enter the Record Books where only One Composers songs has been performed by One Singer for the longest duration.

Anoop Sankar also had a rare opportunity to perform for the prime minister of India Narendra Modi at Thrissur. Anoop rendered the inaugural welcome song written about the prime minister of India.

Filmography

As playback singer

As lyric writer

Television

Awards and honors
 Member and lead male singer of the band "Sangamam" which created Guinness World Records in the year 2002 for the longest musical performance spanning 40 hours
 Frame media award for best singer for his single  "Kurutham kettavan" in 2010
 Vibgyor award for the best single "Kurtham Kettavan" in 2010.

References

External links
 

1979 births
Living people
Indian male playback singers
Singers from Kerala
Film musicians from Kerala
Musicians from Kottayam
21st-century Indian singers
21st-century Indian male singers